Haapala may refer to:

 Haapala (surname), a Finnish surname
 Aliyah Bet, also known as Ha'apala, the immigration of Jews to Palestine